Mürvet Yavuztürk (born November 10, 1985) is a Turkish female football referee and former women's footballer.

Early years
Mürvet Yavuztürk was born in the northern Turkish town Bafra of Samsun Province on November 10, 1985. She is a teacher of physical education at a middle school in Bulancak, Giresun.

Playing career

Club
Mürvet Yavuztürk received her license for her hometown club Samsungücü on February 12, 2001. She debuted in her team's Women's League match on March 17, 2002. This was her only appearance. Since the women's football leagues in Turkey were not held between 2003 and 2006, her football playing career took an early end.

Referee
Yavuztürk began her referee career debuting in the Youth League as second assistant referee on November 1, 2008.

On February 13, 2010, she was appointed to officiate a Coca-Cola Academy U-14 League match as referee. She was also in charge of first, second assistant referee and fourth official roles in various regional leagues for the age categories of boys' U-15, U-18 and A2 League, TFF Third League and TFF Second League. She officiated as referee a Regional Youth Development U-18 League match as referee on December 11, 2010, and a Women's Regional League match on December 26, 2010. She was tasked as referee of a Women's Third League match played on November 9, 2014, and finally she was promoted to officiate a Women's First League match on November 8, 2015.

She debuted internationally serving as an assistant referee in a friendly match of the Turkey women's U-19 team on March 17, 2015.

As of December 20, 2015, Yavuztürk served in 125 football games in various roles.

References

1985 births
People from Bafra
Turkish women's footballers
Turkey women's international footballers
Turkish football referees
Turkish women referees and umpires
Living people
Women association football referees
Women's association footballers not categorized by position